During May 10 to May 12, 1940, Ockenburg, a small Dutch auxiliary airfield near The Hague, was the scene of bitter fighting between German airborne forces and Dutch defenders during World War II.

A German formation of one airborne company of Fallschirmjaeger Regiment 2 and a battalion of Air landing troops of IR.65 (22.ID) was envisaged to take the small Air Force Base (AFB) by surprise attack. The strike was part of the grand strategy to seize the Dutch city of the Hague, where the Dutch Royal Family, Cabinet and Military headquarters were situated. The German battle-plan incorporated large combined airborne and airlanding elements to land at the large Dutch AFB's at Valkenburg (South Holland) and Ypenburg and a smaller party at Ockenburg. These three AFB's were situated east, south and west of the Hague. Around 8,000 Germans were scheduled to land and march onto the Hague, snatching the Dutch Royal Family and beheading the Dutch military by capturing their command-centres.

The German air-operation against the Hague failed utterly. At Ypenburg AFB the German airborne battalion and follow-up air landing units initially gained some successes, but they were rapidly pushed into defence. Many were captured or killed. Some hundreds managed to sustain Dutch counter-attacks isolating themselves in the hamlet Overschie.

At Valkenburg the Germans first managed to seize the airfield running the Dutch defenders off. But after re-grouping the Dutch countered the German pocket and pushed the about 1,000 men strong German presence into a tight defence in the village Valkenburg itself. The Dutch wouldn't manage to force the surviving Germans into surrender though.

The landing at Ockenburg too resulted in initial German seizure of the AFB during which 25 Dutch defenders were KIA. But within short the German landing party - no more than around 400 men - were driven off of the pitch and pushed into the dune area between the AFB and the North Sea. In a daring attempt to break out during the following days, the German force (led by the commander of 22.ID, Lieutenant General Hans Graf von Sponeck himself) managed to outmanoeuvre quite substantial Dutch formations and eventually reach the German held pocket at the hamlet Overschie. At that position a combined remnant force of around 1,000 German invaders managed to hold out until being relieved by German ground-forces in the evening of May 14, 1940, after the Rotterdam Blitz.

Outcome
The German offensive against the Hague constituted a considerable tactical loss to the Germans. The operational goal was not achieved, notwithstanding the fact that large Dutch formations had been tied around the German pockets for quite some time. Formations that thus could not be assigned other tasks.

The Dutch lost 29 men KIA during the AFB defensive battle and the following skirmishes. Another 41 men were lost in counter-offensive actions that saw the Dutch regain the airfield, but that failed to mop-up the German main force who on their turn managed to rebuff Dutch attempts to overrun their elevated dune positions. As such a total toll of 70 men KIA. Besides a material loss of a handful of modern airplanes that had been destroyed on the airfield during the siege.

The Germans lost 52 men in the battle for Ockenburg, including 8 men Luftwaffe personnel. An unknown number was taken prisoner and shipped to Scheveningen and from there on to Ymuiden, from where on 13 and 14 May 1940 ships managed to reach the United Kingdom.

The Luftwaffe lost around 250 airplanes in the area of the Hague, 500 men KIA and about 1,250 airbornes, air-landing troops and Luftwaffe personnel being evacuated as POW's to the United Kingdom on 14 May 1940. Those were lost to the German cause for the duration of the war. That event outraged Hermann Göring when he got word of it. He had several Dutch officers arrested and interrogated on the matter. In the end, on the scale of things, the German losses were obviously painful but not much more than that.

External links
 Site about German invasion of the Netherland, chapter Ockenburg
  Site about Ockenburg
  Site about 1940 Dutch Airforce

Defunct airports in the Netherlands
Airports in South Holland
Buildings and structures in The Hague
History of The Hague
Transport in The Hague
Airborne operations of World War II
Battles and operations of World War II involving the Netherlands
Military operations of World War II involving Germany